Myrina anettae is a butterfly in the family Lycaenidae. It is found in Guinea, Ghana and eastern Uganda. The habitat consists of savanna.

References

Butterflies described in 1924
Amblypodiini